6Q0B44E, sometimes abbreviated to B44E, is a small object, probably an item of space debris, that is currently orbiting Earth outside the orbit of the Moon as of November 2018.

Discovery
6Q0B44E was first observed by Catalina Sky Survey researchers at the Lunar and Planetary Laboratory of the University of Arizona on 28 August 2006. The sighting was confirmed the next day by observations at the Siding Spring Survey and Table Mountain Observatory.

Observations
6Q0B44E was spotted at what was later calculated to be the brightest part of its orbit, at 19th magnitude. As the object moved away from Earth, its brightness dropped on an approximately six-month cycle down to 28th magnitude, severely limiting study.

The object was observed 56 times in the seven months after its discovery, but was lost in March 2007. Another unidentified satellite of Earth, XL8D89E, was discovered in June 2016 on a similar - but not identical - orbit. It is likely, though unproven, that both 6Q0B44E and XL8D89E are the same object, with the orbit shifted in the intervening decade by non-gravitational accelerations (such as slow escape of gas).

Properties
The object is just a few metres across and was classified as probably artificial. 6Q0B44E (and XL8D89E) orbits Earth between 585,000 and 983,000 km, which is 2 to 3 times the distance of the Moon's orbit, over a period of 80 days. Its density was estimated at around 15 kg/m, too low for natural rock but similar to an empty fuel tank.

Ephemerides calculated from the observations suggest that 6Q0B44E probably entered the Earth–Moon system between 2001 and 2003, although it may have arrived up to a decade earlier. Similarities between the discoveries of 6Q0B44E and J002E3, now believed to be part of the Apollo 12 rocket, led some astronomers to speculate that 6Q0B44E may be another relic of human space exploration which has returned to Earth orbit. However, no space mission has been identified as the source of 6Q0B44E.

See also

3753 Cruithne – An asteroid in an Earth horseshoe orbit
 – Another asteroid in an Earth horseshoe orbit
Natural satellite

References

External links 
 The Distant Artificial Satellites Observation Page, accessed 2011-01-08
 Discovery of 6Q0B44E, by Richard Kowalski 30 August 2006

20060828
Discoveries by Richard Kowalski
Near-Earth objects in 2006
Space debris
Claimed moons of Earth